Murueta is a town and municipality located in the province of Biscay, in the autonomous community of Basque Country, northern Spain. According to the 2019 census, it has 308 inhabitants.

References

External links
 MURUETA in the Bernardo Estornés Lasa - Auñamendi Encyclopedia (Euskomedia Fundazioa) 

Municipalities in Biscay